John David Finnemore (born 28 September 1977) is a British comedy writer and actor.  He wrote and performed in the radio series Cabin Pressure, John Finnemore's Souvenir Programme, and John Finnemore's Double Acts, and frequently features in other BBC Radio 4 comedy shows such as The Now Show. Finnemore has won more Comedy.co.uk awards than any other writer, and two of his shows appear in the top ten of the Radio Times list of greatest ever radio comedies.

Early life and education
John Finnemore was born in Reading to parents David and Patricia and has a younger sister, Anna. He attended Dolphin School in Berkshire, High Lea in Dorset and Poole Grammar School. At 19, he moved to Kraków in Poland, where he spent 6 months teaching English.

He then studied English at Peterhouse, Cambridge, where he wrote his dissertation on Thomas Hardy ('Icons, Frames and Freedom in Jude the Obscure') and graduated in 2000. He was a member of the Cambridge Footlights, becoming vice-president in his final year. After graduating, he performed in Sensible Haircut with the Footlights team at the Edinburgh Festival Fringe in 2000.

Career

As writer and comedian 
Finnemore wrote the BBC Radio 4 sitcom Cabin Pressure and played the part of the "consistently cheery steward" Arthur. The sitcom aired for four series between 2008 and Christmas 2014, with a two-part finale at Christmas and New Year 2014–2015. He also wrote a radio sketch show, John Finnemore's Souvenir Programme, which he performed with Simon Kane, Carrie Quinlan, Lawry Lewin and Margaret Cabourn-Smith. The first series was broadcast on BBC Radio 4 in 2011, and a special edition recorded at the Edinburgh Festival Fringe was broadcast in 2012. Seven further series followed annually until 2019, and a ninth series was broadcast in 2021.

A stage version of Souvenir Programme, renamed John Finnemore's Flying Visit, completed two UK tours. The first  between May and June 2018, and the second from September to November 2019 with a bonus date in December.

Finnemore went on to write John Finnemore's Double Acts, an anthology series of loosely connected two-handers. The first series of six episodes aired on BBC Radio 4 from October 2015, and was released on CD in 2016. A second series of six episodes was broadcast in 2017.

Finnemore has written extensively for other comedy shows, both on radio and TV, including That Mitchell and Webb Sound (2003–2009), That Mitchell and Webb Look (2006–2010), Dead Ringers (2003–2007), Tittybangbang (2005–2007), Safety Catch, The Now Show and The Unbelievable Truth (2011). From 2009 to 2012, he co-wrote the podcast David Mitchell's Soap Box with Mitchell. He has also been credited as programme associate on 10 O'Clock Live and Was it Something I Said.

In September 2011, Finnemore wrote a pilot episode for BBC One called George and Bernard Shaw, a sitcom starring Robert Lindsay and Richard Griffiths as an elderly gay couple. The show was not picked up for a full series.

Finnemore has appeared on various BBC Radio 4 shows, including The Now Show, The Unbelievable Truth, I'm Sorry I Haven't A Clue, Just a Minute, and The News Quiz and is a regular performer at the bi-monthly Tall Tales storytelling shows held in North London.

Since 2016, he has written Listener cryptic crosswords under the pseudonym 'Emu', published in The Times.

During the COVID-19 pandemic, Finnemore uploaded videos to his YouTube channel entitled "Cabin Fever" as his Cabin Pressure character Arthur Shappey. These would often involve games or puzzles for the viewer. In this period, he also became the third person to solve Cain's Jawbone, a literary puzzle published by Edward Powys Mathers in 1934. In 2023, Finnemore revealed he was writing a sequel to the puzzle, to be published by Unbound in 2024.

Finnemore has been named as a co-writer for season two of Good Omens with Neil Gaiman, starring Michael Sheen and David Tennant.

As actor / self 
Finnemore appeared as recurring minor character Chris in Miranda Hart's television sitcom Miranda, in the episodes "Teacher" (2009), "Before I Die" (2010), "The Dinner Party" (2013) and "I Do, But to Who?" (2014).

In 2014 Finnemore was the narrator for 24 Hours to Go Broke on Dave in the episodes "Iceland", "Greece", "Germany", "Ireland" and "Armenia". and two years later was runner-up on Celebrity Mastermind, his specialist subject the ghost stories of MR James.

John Finnemore featured as Paul, a Space Shuttle pilot in Armando Iannucci's American space comedy Avenue 5, for which he has also written teleplays for several episodes.

Filmography

Awards
In 2020 the Radio Times released their list of greatest comedies ever, as judged by an expert panel. Finnemore was the only individual with two entries in the top ten, with Cabin Pressure and John Finnemore's Souvenir Programme taking eighth and tenth spots respectively. Cabin Pressure was also voted "Comedy of the Year" in 2014 across TV and radio, making it the first radio show to be given the honour.

Finnemore has won more Comedy.co.uk Awards than any other writer. When adding together shows for which Finnemore is the main writer or an additional writer, his work has resulted in him winning 13 awards.

Finnemore has also written for other shows that have won Comedy.co.uk Awards such as That Mitchell and Webb Sound which was voted "Best British Radio Sketch Show" in 2009, 2010, and 2013; That Mitchell and Webb Look which was voted "Best British TV Sketch Show" in 2006 and 2009; and The Unbelievable Truth which was voted "Best British Radio Panel Show" in 2011.

Selected awards

References

External links
 
 John Finnemore's blog
 
 John Finnemore fansite
 Cabin Pressure fansite
 John Finnemore at British Comedy Guide

1977 births
Living people
Alumni of Peterhouse, Cambridge
People educated at Poole Grammar School
English comedy writers
English male television actors
English male radio actors
People from Reading, Berkshire
English male writers
21st-century English comedians
The Times people
Crossword compilers